Bacharam is a village in Rangareddy district in Telangana, India. It falls under Hayathnagar mandal. It is closer to the Outer Ring Road, Hyderabad.

Geography 

Bacharam is a village in Telangana State, Rangareddy District, Hayathnagar Mandal. Now ORR (Outer Ring Road) is main geographical attraction to this village.

Boundaries 

 East:Ravirala
 West:Pratapa singaram
 North:Edulabad
 South:Taramathipet

Cultural history 
Bacharam is having nearly 4 forts which were constructed by Nizam Razakar after accepting the Military Cooperation with British India,  in which Main Fort is constituted at Middle of the Village near Darga.

The Village is having a Holy Temple of Sri Sri Sri Lakshmi Narasimha Swamy on the Hill top of Bacharam, (Popularly known as Gnanagiri Gutta). This holy temple constructed recently, two other ancient temples, one is Lord Shiva and other is Lord Rama at the Doors (Entrance) of the village.  Village hosts for Sri Lakshmi Narsimha Jatara or Congregation annually, and approximately a lakh people gather around the small village of Bacharam and its adjacent stream/rivulet, Moosi, 12 km from Uppal city.

Reference 

Villages in Ranga Reddy district